The Closed Circle: An interpretation of the Arabs is a 1989 book by author David Pryce-Jones that was published by Harper & Row.

Summary
This book discusses the tribal roots of Arab society which form the basis of its cultural traditions. The author documents the cultural forces which drive the violence and mayhem that, in his view, is characteristic of Arab societies in their dealings with each other and with the West.

The author argues that the Arab world is stuck in an age-old tribalism and behavior from which it is unable to evolve. In tribal society, loyalty is extended to close kin and other members of the tribe. In the Arab world those who seek power achieve it by plotting secretly and ruthlessly eliminating their rivals.

Table of contents
Tribal Society and Its Legacy
Shame and Honor
Western Approaches
Power Challenging and Careerism
Men and Women
The Turkish Example
Colonialism
The Impact of Nazism
The Impact of Communism
Arabia and Oil
The Issue of Palestine
Power Holders
Image and Identity
Conclusion

See also
The Arab Mind
The Bell Curve
The Camp of the Saints
Anti-Arabism

References

1989 non-fiction books
Race-related controversies in literature
Stereotypes of Arab people
History books about ethnic groups